A concise postal history of French Annam protectorate and Tongking protectorate, former territories of colonial French Indochina, that were located in present-day Vietnam. Dates
1888 - 1892

Stamp issues

Overview 

The protectorate government over Annam and Tonkin issued only a single series of stamps. On 21 January 1888 the protectorates overprinted "A & T" or "A – T" (an abbreviation for the French protectorates of Annam and Tonkin) on nine different French colonial commerce type stamps. These overprints included a surcharge of either 1 centime or 5 centimes. The surcharges that were added to these postage stamps come in different types with various letters and numerals and a variety of errors are known to exist.

By the year 1892 the regular issue postage stamps of French Indochina had replaced the overprint issues of Annam & Tonkin.

List 

 Dates   1888 - 1892  
 Currency   100 centimes = 1 franc  
 Refer   Indo-China Territories

Geography 
Tongking, also spelt Tonkin, is the northern part of Vietnam. Annam comprises most of central Vietnam. 
 
Capital  Hanoi  
Frontiers  Tongking is bounded by China (north); Gulf of Tongking (east); Annam (south); Laos (west). Annam is bounded by Tongking (north); Cochinchina (south); South China Sea (east); Cambodia and Laos (west).  
Language  Vietnamese and French.  
Religion  Mahayana Buddhism, Taoism and Confucianism

History 
1885  Annam & Tongking became French protectorates following war with China.  
1887  Included in Indochina with Cambodia and Cochinchina.  
1888  (21 January) One issue was released with 9 stamps. These stamps were French Colonial Commerce types overprinted A&T plus a surcharge of either 1 or 5 centimes.  
1892  The issue was replaced by stamps of Indochina.  
1893  Laos was added to the union.  
1949  (14 June) Annam & Tongking became part of the new colony of Vietnam.

References

Sources 
 Stanley Gibbons Ltd: various catalogues
Rossiter, Stuart & John Flower. The Stamp Atlas. London: Macdonald, 1986. 
 Encyclopaedia of Postal History

French Indochina
Philately of Vietnam